Jean-Édouard-Lucien Rupp (13 October 1905 – 28 January 1983) was a French prelate of the Catholic Church who served as Bishop of Monaco from 1962 to 1971 and then worked in the diplomatic service of the Holy See until he retired in 1980.

Biography 
Jean Rupp was born in Saint-Germain-en-Laye on 13 October 1905. He entered the Saint Sulpice Seminary of Issy-les-Moulineaux in 1928. He was ordained a priest on 31 March 1934.

In 1946, in concert with Jean Larnaud, a Catholic layman, and the support of the Apostolic Nuncio to France, Angelo Roncalli (later Pope John XXIII), he founded the International Catholic Center for Cooperation with UNESCO (Centre Catholique International de Coopération avec l’UNESCO or CCIC), which launched its operations the next year. In 1947, Pope Pius XII named him to represent the Holy See to the United Nations Educational, Scientific and Cultural Organization (UNESCO), though as a liaison rather than a formal diplomatic role.

Pope Pius XII appointed him auxiliary bishop of Paris for the Ordinariate for Eastern Catholics in France on 28 October 1954.  Pope John XXIII named him the Bishop of Monaco on 9 June 1962 and he was enthroned there on 7 October.

Rupp participated in all four sessions of the Second Vatican Council. In 1964 he addressed the Council at length on the lack of Christian solidarity demonstrated in failing to denounce the Armenian genocide. He was appreciated for his concern for oecumenism with the Anglican Church as well. Rupp was a member of the conservative Coetus Internationalis Patrum.

On 8 May 1971, Pope Paul VI named him Apostolic Pro-Nuncio to Iraq, raising him to the rank of archbishop, and then added the title Pro-Nuncio to Kuwait on 4 March 1975.

On 13 July 1978, a month before his death, Paul VI appointed Rupp the Permanent Observer of the Holy See to the United Nations in Geneva. He retired from this post on 5 July 1980 and Edoardo Rovida succeeded him in this post.

In 1980, when Rupp turned 75, the standard age for a prelate to retire from active ministry, Pope John Paul II named him a canon of the Basilica of St. Mary Major. Rupp died in Rome on 28 January 1983 and was buried in that basilica on 31 January.

Writings 
 L’idée de chrétienté dans la pensée pontificale des origins à Innocent III, Presses modernes, 1939
 Brésil, espoir chrétien, Spes, 1965
 Explorations œcuméniques, Pastorelly, 1967
 Héros chrétiens de l’est. Hommage au déporté Kolbe, 1972
 Message ecclésial de Solowiew. Présage et illustration de Vatican II., Lethielleux, Paris and Brussels, 1975
 Un levier pour l’œcuménisme: Wladimir Solowiew, Lethielleux, 1975
 Histoire de l’Église de Paris, 1948 réédition Robert laffont, 1992
 Un évêque revient d'U.R.S.S.
 Lumière à l'Est, Pastorelly, 1969
 Docteur pour nos temps: Catherine et Thérèse, Lethielleux , 1971

Notes

References
 

1905 births
1983 deaths
Bishops of Monaco
Auxiliary bishops of Paris
Apostolic Nuncios to Iraq
Apostolic Nuncios to Kuwait
People from Saint-Germain-en-Laye